Margate railway station serves the town of Margate in Thanet, Kent, England. The station and all trains that serve the station are operated by Southeastern.

Trains from the station generally run to Victoria via  or to  via Ramsgate, Canterbury West and Ashford International.

History

Trains first reached Ramsgate in April 1846 when the South Eastern Railway (SER) opened a line from Canterbury. It terminated at Ramsgate SER, later to be called Ramsgate Town. Later the same year the line opened across Thanet to Margate, to Margate SER, (later Margate Sands). Trains from Canterbury for Margate had to reverse at Ramsgate Town; a chord was built bypassing the station in 1864, costing £13,707. St Lawrence for Pegwell Bay railway station was opened in 1864 just before this chord but closed in 1916.

The London Chatham & Dover Railway (LCDR) reached Margate from Herne Bay on 5 October 1863. This called at Margate LC&DR (later Margate West), East Margate (later Margate East), Broadstairs and via a  tunnel terminated at Ramsgate LC&DR (later Ramsgate Harbour), located near the harbour and beach.

This arrangement was inherited by Southern Railway on grouping in 1923. To simplify the arrangement in 1926 a new line was opened connecting the SER line from the site of St Lawrence to the LCDR line just south of Broadstairs. The current Ramsgate station and a new station at Dumpton Park were built on this new line. The Ramsgate Harbour station, line through the tunnel, and the Ramsgate Town station and old SER line across to Margate Sands were all closed in July 1926. Margate West station was renamed Margate in 1926. Margate East closed on 4 May 1953.

Until 1967 a service operated between Margate and Birkenhead Woodside via Ashford, Redhill, Reading, Oxford, Birmingham Snow Hill and Shrewsbury. The stock was provided on alternate days by successors to the Southern Railway and the Great Western Railway, being the Southern Region and the Western Region under British Rail. At Ashford a portion from Sandwich, Deal and Dover was attached/detached, likewise a Brighton portion at Redhill.

Architecture
The station was rebuilt in 1926 by the SR's chief assistant architect, Edwin Maxwell Fry. The building is constructed in a monumental classical style from brown brick with a stone dressing and a hipped tiled roof. The booking hall was built in a similar manner, in a distinctive ellipse shape with pendant lighting. It was Grade II listed in 1987.

Cultural references
The station was featured in Only Fools and Horses, in the 1989 episode The Jolly Boys' Outing. Del Boy and Rodney discover the station is closed due to a strike, after being stuck in Margate following their coach blowing up.

Services

All services at Margate are operated by Southeastern  using  and  EMUs.

The typical off-peak service in trains per hour is:

 1 tph to London St Pancras International via  and 
 1 tph to London St Pancras International via  and 
 1 tph to  via Chatham 
 2 tph to 

References
Citations

Sources

External links

Margate
Railway stations in Kent
DfT Category D stations
Former London, Chatham and Dover Railway stations
Railway stations in Great Britain opened in 1863
Railway stations served by Southeastern
Grade II listed railway stations
Grade II listed buildings in Kent
Art Deco architecture in England
Art Deco railway stations